The Chief Shabbona Trail is a hiking, bicycling and canoeing trail, located between Joliet and Morris, Illinois.

Hiking, bicycling and canoeing are free. The trail is open year-round.

Trail length

The Shabbona trail extends from frontage road access at Interstate 55 east of Channahon to Gebhard Woods State Park in Morris.

   1 Mile: Stratton State Park to Gebhard Woods State Park
  2 Miles: Stratton State Park to Gebhard Woods State Park and back
  3 Miles: Gebhard Woods State Park to Chief Shabbona grave and back
  6 Miles: Aux Sable Aqueduct (near Minooka, Illinois) to Gebhard Woods State Park
 10 Miles: Dresden Lock to  Woods State Park
 12 Miles: Gebhard Woods State Park to Aux Sable Aqueduct and back
 15 Miles: Channahon State Park to Gebhard Woods State Park -
 Can also be canoed
 20 Miles:
 Interstate 55 frontage road access to Gebhard Woods State Park
 Gebhard Woods State Park to Dresden Lock and back

Trail options
The Shabbona Trail is compacted gravel and remarkably well protected from traffic and the elements. There is only one point where a rural two-lane road is crossed. The remainder of the trail is a National Park Service Trail, maintained by the State of Illinois. Trees line most of the trail. Much of the trail is near the Illinois River. You can:
 Hike or backpack
 Bicycle
 Cross-Country Ski

Camping and boating
Camping is available at:
 Channahon State Park
 Gebhard Woods State Park (30-acre site)
 Illinois River boating access is available at Stratton State Park

Grave

Chief Shabbona's grave is in the center of Evergreen Cemetery in Morris, Illinois. It is marked by a large granite boulder.  A brass marker at the base includes this information:
 Chief Shabbona
 Born 1775
 Died 17 July 1859

History
The Chief Shabbona Historical Trail was established on July 30, 1960, by Troop 25. The trail is Nationally Approved by the Boy Scouts of America and follows the paths that Shabbona was known to have walked. By 1963, over 10,000 scouts hiked the trail. 2010 marks the 50th anniversary of the trail. Along the way, you will see full-size replicas of canal boats, locktender's house, working stone locks and fully restored stone aqueducts. These sites date back to when the Illinois and Michigan Canal was built in the mid-19th century.

Wildlife and vegetation
The habitat ranges from open prairie grasslands to dense woods. The nearby Illinois River provides panoramic views in many areas. The trail is shaded in most areas by a variety of trees including walnut, oak, ash, maple, sycamore, hawthorn and cottonwood.  Springtime wildflowers include trillium, bluebell, white trout lily, violets, wild ginger, phlox, and toothwort.  Songbirds, mallards, wood ducks, green herons and great blue herons feed and nest all along the trail. You can fish for bass, crappie, bluegill, catfish and bullhead. Beaver, muskrat, mink, raccoon and deer can often be seen.

Flier
  is a printable trail Map.

External links
 National Park Service Illinois & Michigan Canal
 Gebhard Woods State Park

Protected areas of Grundy County, Illinois
Hiking trails in Illinois
Protected areas of Will County, Illinois